The 1892 Swarthmore Quakers football team was an American football team that represented Swarthmore College as an independent during the 1892 college football season. The team compiled a 7–3 record and outscored opponents by a total of 166 to 91. Jacob K. Shell was the head coach. 

Fullback George H. Brooke was the team captain. Other key players included quarterback Charles G. Hodge, halfbacks Kent W. Hughes and Samuel C. Palmer, and ends A. K. White and Edwin P. Bond.

Schedule

References

Swarthmore
Swarthmore Garnet Tide football seasons
Swarthmore Quakers football